Helios Towers is a UK-based telecommunications tower company. It is listed on the London Stock Exchange and is a constituent of the FTSE 250 Index.

History
The company was established in Mauritius with financial backing from George Soros, Millicom and Bharti Airtel in 2009. After an aborted attempt at launching a public issue in 2018, it was the subject of an initial public offering on the London Stock Exchange in 2019.

Operations
The company owns more than 10,500 mobile communications towers located in Tanzania, Democratic Republic of the Congo, Ghana, Congo Brazzaville, South Africa, Senegal, Madagascar and Malawi.

References

British companies established in 2009
Telecommunications companies established in 2009
2009 establishments in Mauritius
Companies listed on the London Stock Exchange